Frontier Days is a common name for a major rodeo event. At least five cities called their annual rodeo "Frontier Days."

Cities with a "Frontier Days" event

 Prescott, Arizona
 Willits, California
 Abbyville, Kansas
 Charlotte, Michigan
 Walla Walla, Washington
 Cheyenne, Wyoming

Cheyenne Frontier Days

Cheyenne Frontier Days, held annually since 1897 in Cheyenne, Wyoming, is the largest rodeo and western celebration in the world. The event, which always occurs in the last week of July, draws over hundreds of thousands of people to the city every year. In 2017, over 241,000 people bought tickets for the rodeo, concerts, and other events.

Bibliography

References

External links
 Prescott, AZ Frontier Days
 Willits, CA Frontier Days
 Charlotte, MI Frontier Days
 Walla Walla, WA Fair & Frontier Days
 Cheyenne, WY Frontier Days

Rodeos